The Alpine Journal (AJ) is an annual publication by the Alpine Club of London. It is the oldest mountaineering journal in the world.

History 
The journal was first published on 2 March 1863 by the publishing house of Longman in London, with Hereford Brooke George as its first editor. It was a replacement for Peaks, Passes, and Glaciers, which had been issued in two series: in 1858 (with John Ball as editor), and 1862 (in two volumes, with Edward Shirley Kennedy as editor).

The journal covers all aspects of mountains and mountaineering, including expeditions, adventure, art, literature, geography, history, geology, medicine, ethics and the mountain environment, and the history of mountain exploration, from early ascents in the Alps, exploration of the Himalaya and the succession of attempts on Mount Everest, to present-day exploits.

Online access
Journal volumes since 1926 (bar the current issue) are freely available online. Digital scans of earlier volumes of the Alpine Journal from 1863 to 1926 have been made by academic libraries and are available online.

Notable editors 
The following people have edited the journal:
 Leslie Stephen (1868–1872)
 Douglas Freshfield (1872–1880)
 Arthur John Butler (1890–1893)
 George Yeld (1896–1926)
 John Percy Farrar (1920–1926, co-editor)
 Edward Lisle Strutt (1927–1937)
 T. Graham Brown (1949–1953)
 Johanna Merz (1992–1998)

References

External links 
  including an online archive of back issues 1926 to 2019
 Alpine Journal back issues 1863 to 1926, online at the Internet Archive
 Alpine Journal back issues 1863 to 2002, full text or limited search, online at Hathi Trust

1863 establishments in the United Kingdom
Alpine Club (UK)
Annual magazines published in the United Kingdom
Sports magazines published in the United Kingdom
Climbing magazines
English-language magazines
Magazines published in London
Magazines established in 1863